William Sawtrey, also known as William Salter (died March 1401) was an English Roman Catholic priest and Lollard martyr. He was executed for heresy.

Sawtrey was born in Norfolk, England. He was a follower of John Wycliffe, the leader of an early reformation movement called Lollardy.

Sawtrey's association with Lollardy
Sawtrey was a priest at two Norfolk churches, St Margaret's in Lynn and Tilney.

He preached and endorsed Lollard beliefs, including the rejection of Catholic saints and the sacrament of Eucharist. Of the latter, he claimed that "after the consecration [of the host] by the priest there remaineth true material bread" (Trevelyan 334).

As a result of spreading these views, Sawtrey was taken to Henry le Despenser on 30 April 1399. Le Despenser, a bishop then based in North Elmham, ordered an examination of Sawtrey. The examination lasted for two days. Sawtrey's examiners claimed that he rejected free will, and that he did not believe in venerating images and embarking on pilgrimages. He was therefore charged with heresy and sent to an episcopal prison. Sawtrey denounced Lollardy upon his release. He abjured privately at first, but then publicly in Lynn on 25 May 1399. He appeared before le Despenser in St John's Hospital the next day, and swore on the Gospels that he would never again preach Lollardy. He also promised to never hear confession without a license from le Despenser.

In 1401, Sawtrey moved to London and began working as a parish-priest at St Osyth's, where he continued to preach Lollard beliefs. It is possible that he moved to London in order to distance himself from le Despenser, but he had not removed himself from the anti-Lollard sentiment of the Catholic Church. One year earlier, De heretico comburendo ("Regarding the burning of heretics") was passed. The statute called for the burning of heretics either plainly rejecting Catholicism, or accepting Catholic beliefs but returning to their previous heretical beliefs. Sawtrey was summoned to appear at St Paul's Cathedral on 12 February 1401.

Sawtrey appeared before Archbishop Thomas Arundel. Before convocation, Sawtrey was delivered the following heretical charges: failure to "adore the true cross" (National Biography 869), belief that a priest's time spent in hourly prayers could be better spent preaching and spreading the word of God, his opinion on the temporalities of the church and on how the money could be put to better use, preaching on adoration of mankind over angels, and finally his belief in consubstantiation. Sawtrey resisted, and was once again charged with heresy.

Sawtrey demanded a copy of his charges and was given 18 February to make an appeal. At his appeal before Parliament he defended his beliefs with quotes from St John, St Paul, and St Augustine. His defence was heavily questioned by Arundel, who spent three hours questioning of the topic of the Eucharist alone, all the while trying to convert him back to Catholicism. Sawtrey resisted, and on 23 February charges were once again made against him. He was condemned and "through seven successive stages he was degraded from priest to doorkeeper, then stripped of every clerical function, attribute, and vestment".

Sawtrey was convicted and sentenced to death on 26 February 1401. In March, he was taken to Smithfield and publicly burned at the stake. He was the first follower of Lollardy to die for his beliefs. He and John Purvey, a friend and follower of John Wycliffe who also was tortured for his beliefs, were the two most egregious cases against Lollardy committed under the Statute of Heresy.

After effects
The lower classes of England were quick to catch on to Lollard ideas, especially about disbursing Church funds to aid people in need and to ease lower class financial stresses caused by heavy taxation. The representatives of the lower class made efforts on two occasions to convince King Henry IV and Parliament to appropriate the Church's money and to use it for the people of England. The Church reacted against this proposal and, with the help of the King, set forth a number of statutes to protect Church temporalities. Among these orders was the statute De heretico comburendo, which stated that heresy was punishable by means of public burning.

The severity of Sawtrey and Purvey's punishments created a wave of Lollard supporters. Among them was John Oldcastle, a knight and captain for the Prince of Wales. He protected and hid preachers from the Statute of Heresy. Oldcastle and other Lollard-sympathising knights pleaded with King Henry IV to change the law. They argued that the King should take the money the Church was wasting and put it into England's armoury, almshouses, and universities. Many students of Oxford University were also Lollard sympathisers. Students translated Wycliffe's work and began to debate the lawfulness of Bible translations.

However, despite their efforts, the persecution of Lollards continued. The knights' arguments were shot down, and Oxford was discredited by the Church. Nevertheless, Lollard believers continued practising their faith in an underground network.

Other supporters
(After John Wycliffe's death, Archbishop William Courtenay began to defend his beliefs in 1382. He argued concepts such as consubstantiation, the belief that the Eucharist is still indeed bread and that body of Christ exists simultaneously with the bread. He also used the Bible to explain that certain mass ceremonies were not specifically ordered by Christ. He defended the belief that, "a priest in mortal sin could not administer the Sacraments." He also supported Wycliffe in his opinion about confession, which was that if a man is truly contrite after his verbal confession, then no other action is necessary. The final point he argued was that of papacy. In his life Wycliffe had proposed that Pope Urban VI should be the last pope and that people govern themselves under their own laws.)

The above statement is not only historically inaccurate but completely false.  Archbishop William Courtney condemned Wycliffe. Courtenay "held a council at Canterbury in 1382 that condemned Wycliffe, whose works Courtenay censured. He obtained Richard’s permission to imprison heretics (1382) and to seize heretical books (1388), bringing him into conflict with John of Gaunt, duke of Lancaster and Wycliffe’s protector. In November 1382 Courtenay assembled a convocation at Oxford, where he forced the academic Lollards (holders of certain religious tenets derived from Wycliffe’s teachings) into submission. He protested the second (1390) Statute of Provisors, which disapproved of ecclesiastical offices appointed by the pope; he condemned it as a restraint upon apostolic power and liberty."- Encyclopaedia Brittanica

Footnotes

References
Feiling, Keith. A History of England. London:  Macmillan, 1950. p. 284. Print.
MacFarlane, K.B. John Wycliffe and the Beginnings of English Nonconformity. London: English Universities Press, 1966. pp. 150–151. Print.

Trevelyan, George Macaulay. England in the Age of Wycliffe. London: Longmans, Green, and Co., 1904. pp. 293, 334. Print.

Notes

1401 deaths
14th-century English Roman Catholic priests
Executed people from Norfolk
Lollard martyrs
People executed by the Kingdom of England by burning
People executed for heresy
People executed under the Lancastrians
People from King's Lynn
Year of birth unknown